Lambton—Kent—Middlesex (formerly known as Middlesex—Kent—Lambton) is a federal  electoral district in Ontario, Canada, that has been represented in the House of Commons of Canada since 1997.

The district includes all of Middlesex County except the City of London and Thames Centre Township, all of the Municipality of Chatham-Kent north of the Thames River, and excluding the former City of Chatham, and the Municipalities of Lambton Shores, Brooke-Alvinston Township, Dawn Euphemia Township, Warwick Township and the Indian reserves of Kettle Point and Walpole Island in the County of Lambton. The population in 2001 was 105,291, and the area is 5,277 km².

History
It was created in 1996 from Kent and Lambton—Middlesex. It was renamed "Middlesex—Kent—Lambton" briefly in 2003 to 2004. The retirement of longtime MP Rose-Marie Ur in 2006 allowed Bev Shipley, her Conservative opponent in 2004, to seize the riding. The Tories have held the riding without serious difficulty ever since, including in 2015 during the Liberal surge that swept through Ontario.

This riding lost a fraction of territory to Chatham-Kent—Leamington and gained a fraction from Chatham-Kent—Essex during the 2012 electoral redistribution.

Demographics 
According to the 2021 Canada Census

Ethnic groups: 91.8% White, 4.9% Indigenous

Languages: 90.5% English, 1.5% Dutch, 1.2% Portuguese, 1.0% French, 1.0% German

Religions: 63.6% Christian (25.1% Catholic, 10.8% United Church, 5.3% Anglican, 3.2% Presbyterian, 2.6% Baptist, 1.4% Reformed, 1.2% Pentecostal, 14.0% Other), 35.0% None

Median income: $42,400 (2020)

Average income: $52,400 (2020)

Members of Parliament
This riding has elected the following Members of Parliament:

Election results

				

Note: Conservative vote is compared to the total of the Canadian Alliance vote and Progressive Conservative vote in 2000 election.

Note: Canadian Alliance vote is compared to the Reform vote in 1997 election.

See also
 List of Canadian federal electoral districts
 Past Canadian electoral districts

References

Riding history from the Library of Parliament:
Lambton—Kent—Middlesex (1996 - 2003)
Middlesex—Lambton—Kent (2003 - 2004)
Lambton—Kent—Middlesex (2004 - 2008)
Lambton—Kent—Middlesex 2011 results from Elections Canada
 Campaign expense data from Elections Canada

Notes

Ontario federal electoral districts
Chatham-Kent
Strathroy-Caradoc